Glencairn is a subway station on Line 1 Yonge–University in Toronto, Ontario, Canada. It is located in the median of William R. Allen Road at Glencairn Avenue. Wi-Fi service is available at this station.

The station is in the Glen Park neighbourhood of the city, a lower-density residential area, and despite being near a cluster of high-density residential buildings to the south and a small commercial strip, Marlee Village, to the west, it is one of the least-used stations.

History
The station opened in 1978 in what was then the Borough of North York. It was part of the subway line extension from St. George to Wilson station.

A station at Glencairn and Yonge was considered for the North Yonge extension in the late 1960s and early 1970s. However, this was dropped (along with Glen Echo Station at Yonge Boulevard) because of budgetary concerns. If built, it would have been placed between Eglinton and Lawrence stations on the Yonge line.

Station description
Glencairn station was constructed at ground level within the median of Allen Road, between the Glencairn Avenue and Viewmount Avenue bridges.

Glencairn Avenue, at the north end of the station, has entrances on the north and south side of the street. Here there are both up and down escalators and stairs between the centre train platform, the intermediate concourse where there is a collectors booth and turnstiles, and street level. Viewmount Avenue, at the south end of the station, only has stairs to an automatic entrance on the north side of the street. There are no elevators at this station.

Architecture and art

Glencairn was designed by Adamson Associates. A central vaulted glass roof spans the length of the station, allowing the penetration of natural light to all areas of the station during the day and to be seen at night as a long illuminated strip of light.

The glass roof is directly above the single centre platform. This is similarly to Yorkdale station, where the interior walls of the station at platform level are unfinished concrete, with curved sections over the tracks to form a lower ceiling. Unlike Yorkdale, the curve is less sudden making the walls more rounded in appearance and they are clad with white horizontal panels between vertical concrete "ribs", along with a wider orange panel strip displaying the station name. Platform level seating is sheltered within glass walls. Wayfinding signage is backlit. Floors and some of the walls are clad with red-brown tiles.

Glencairn features an artistic skylight entitled Joy designed by Rita Letendre. It existed in two versions, both by the same artist. The first version was installed in 1977 and consisted of painted translucent glazed act panels; it was removed in the early 1990s at the artist's request after leakage damaged the art panels below the skylight, and was replaced with a lighter weight-supported glazing system. The second version, installed in 2020, is a reinterpretation of the original work. It consists of art colours inserted between two glass panels.

Surface connections

TTC routes serving the station include:

Transfers to buses occur at curbside stops outside this station. 109 Ranee runs along Marlee Avenue one block west of Glencairn station.

References

External links

Line 1 Yonge–University stations
Railway stations in Canada opened in 1978
Railway stations in highway medians